Escola Internacional do Amazonas (Amazonas English Academy or International School of Amazonas) is an international school located in the Brazilian city of Manaus, which operates in the English language for students from two years six months up to 18 years.

References

External links 
Amazonas English Academy

Schools in Manaus
British international schools
British international schools in Brazil
Secondary schools in Brazil
Education in Amazonas (Brazilian state)